Rhaphithamnus is a genus of flowering plants in the family Verbenaceae.

Traditionally, it has been considered by the locals that the berries of this genus of plants are toxic or poisonous, so their consumption is not recommended.

Species
 Rhaphithamnus spinosus (Juss.) Moldenke Common names in Chile and Argentina repu, arayan macho and espino negro ( = 'black-thorn').
 Rhaphithamnus venustus (Phil.) Rob.

Use in Chilean folk medicine
In the Los Lagos Region of southern Chile R. spinosus  is one of three plant species believed in local folk medicine to be antidotes to the anticholinergic poisoning caused by the dangerous hallucinogenic plant Latua pubiflora ( Solanaceae ). It is used by the shamans of the indigenous Huilliche people who employ Latua to enter trance in machitun healing rituals.

Gallery

References

External links

Verbenaceae
Verbenaceae genera
Taxonomy articles created by Polbot